Addiction is a 2004 Finnish romantic drama film directed by Minna Virtanen. It is the last film in the Restless trilogy, preceded by Restless (2000) and Me and Morrison (2001).

Addiction received a lot of criticism. It has been described as two-dimensional and "peeping entertainment".

Cast 
Source:
 Mi Grönlund as Jonna
 Nicke Lignell as Niklas
 Jasper Pääkkönen as Aleksi
 Amira Khalifa as Nora
 Hanna Karjalainen as Helena
 Saija Lentonen as Sanna
 Jukka Puotila as Herman
 Miska Kaukonen as Mika

References

External links 
 

Films set in Finland
Films shot in Finland
2004 romantic drama films
2004 films
Finnish romantic drama films
2000s Finnish-language films